Several ships have been named Russia, or a derivation:
 SS Russia (1867), a Cunard liner
 SS Russia (1872), an iron-hulled American Great Lakes package freighter 
 Russia (1876), also known as Eugenia Vesta, Canadian scow schooner
 SS Russian (1895), a British cargo ship, formerly the Victorian
 SS Russia, launched 1908, later SS Fuso Maru, a Japanese ocean liner 
 Russia a Belgian ship wrecked on 21 December 1910

References

Ship names